Attractie- & Vakantiepark Slagharen is an Amusement park and holiday resort in Slagharen, located in the Dutch province Overijssel. The park opened in 1963 and was originally named Ponypark Slagharen. The logo contains the English name Slagharen Themepark & Resort.

The Amusement park contains two areas, which are connected by a main street containing shops and restaurants. The park has more than 30 attractions, including 2 Roller coasters. The park contains 6 themed areas: Indian, Yellowstone, New Orleans, Mexican, Wild West and Jules Adventureland (named after the French writer Jules Verne).

The entrance and Apollo, Enterprise and Free Fall rides are all found at the southern end of the park. Whilst, the larger roller coasters including Gold Rush, Wild West Adventure and Tomahawk rides are at the northern end of the park. The flour mill built in 1859 named De Pionier can also be found at the northern end of the park.

Adjacent to the main street is the ferris wheel and the Sky Tower. A cable car suspended above the main street connects the different areas of the park and has a number of stations including those located within the Apollo and Kids Country.

Within the park, there are a number of mobile homes and bungalows for visitors to stay in. The park expanded to include an area with tipi tents and a water park named Sunny Beach.  The park further expanded in 2002 to include a campground.

History

1960s 
In 1963 a shop keeper named Henk Bemboom built some vacation homes on a piece of farmland around an old farmhouse in Slagharen. As an extra attraction he offered every vacation home a Shetland pony and a small carriage. During Pentecost the holiday park opened with twenty-four homes. During this time Shetland ponies were a rare sight in The Netherlands. Because of this, the park gained a lot of attention. The following year the amount of homes doubled. A further large outdoor swimming pool and play area was added.

During 1965, development started on the amusement park. For the enjoyment of the parks guests, fairground rides were placed in the park. A theater with a Water organ and distorting mirrors were added. The holiday park was expended to 100 homes.

In 1966 Sulky was added in addition to a ponytrack, a bowling-ally and a Diorama.

In 1968 a Dark ride opened named "nautilus". This has now been broken down. When it first opened the ride was named Onderwaterwereld. This served as the third large attraction in the park. the holiday park also expanded further. In 1967 it already contained 160 homes. In 1969 Bumper cars and a Calypso were added. This ride was broken down in 2013.

1970s 
The holiday park was further expended to a total of 171 homes in 1970, 183 in 1971 and 302 in 1972. Furthermore, a large restaurant was opened in 1971.

In the years following the park expanded to become an amusement park. In 1972 Bemboom introduced the principle of a ticket were you would pay once and get unlimited access to all the attractions. Previously visitors would have to pay for every ride. In 1973 the rides Octopus (renamed to "El Torito" in 2016) and Weens Reuzenrad (Ferris wheel) were added to the park. Weens Reuzenrad was later replaced by Chuck Wagon. A large slide named the Mountain Slide was added to the park in 1974. The same year The Lunik was built in the park. In 1975 the park acquired a secondhand 28 meter high watchtower named Zeppelin. The same year 25 new homes was added to the holiday park.

In 1976 a kind of carousel themed after the landing on to moon was added to the park, this was than named Apollo 14. The same year the Dombomolen was added. This year the cable car was also constructed. 5 kilometers away from the park, two holiday parks were built with 185 homes (including ponies).

In 1977 a small Carousel, named Merry go Mad, was added to the park. A new ponyhal, shooting range (Shooting gallery) and the slightly larger rides Enterprise and Tomahawk (a Troika) were also built.

A large monorail was built in the park in 1978. Its track reached almost everywhere in the park. The same year the film theater named El Teatro opened. This film theater has now been transformed into a 4D cinema. In 1979 the large roller coaster named Looping Star (later demolished in 2016) was built. This was the first roller coaster featuring a loop in The Netherlands. Furthermore, the same year the fifty meter high Ferris wheel, Big Wheel was built and Rodeo Rider was added.

Attractions

Roller coasters
 Mine Train
 Thunder Loop (Closed 2 October 2016)
 Gold Rush (Opened 13 April 2017, replacing Thunder Loop)

Water rides
 Expedition Nautilus
 Ripsaw Falls

Other rides
 Apollo
 Big Wheel
 Chuck Wagon
 Eagle
 El Teatro
 Enterprise
 Fogg's Trouble
 Free Fall
 Gallopers
 Kabelbaan
 Loggers Slides
 Magic Bikes
 Merry go Mad
 Monorail
 Mountain Slide
 Indian Pony ride
 Jumbo
 Kids Country
 Octopus
 Old Timer
 Passepartout Explorer
 Phileas Fun House
 Pirate
 Sky Tower
 Tomahawk
 Western Village Theater
 Wild West Adventure

Popular culture 
Slagharen was featured in the Trump - commercial "America first, Netherlands second" by Arjen Lubach. Within weeks, the ad generated more than 24 million views on YouTube. In the video they mention two parks as one, Slagharen and PonyParkCity. The video only shows a few seconds worth of footage from Slagharen before quickly changing to show the ponies at PonyParkCity.

See also

 Parques Reunidos

References

External links
Official website
Attractiepark Slagharen on rcdb.com

Amusement parks in the Netherlands
Western (genre) theme parks
Hardenberg
Buildings and structures in Overijssel
Tourist attractions in Overijssel
1963 establishments in the Netherlands
Parques Reunidos
Amusement parks opened in 1963
20th-century architecture in the Netherlands